Lucien Monsi-Agboka (3 June 1926 − 27 April 2008) was a Beninese Roman Catholic bishop.

Ordained to the priesthood in 1957, Monsi-Agboka was named bishop of Roman Catholic Diocese of Abomey, Benin in 1963 and retired in 2002.

References 

1926 births
2008 deaths
People from Cotonou
20th-century Roman Catholic bishops in Benin
Roman Catholic bishops of Abomey